The 2015 Mar del Plata Sevens was the XIX edition of the tournament. Three categories of competition took place on January 10 and 11, 2015: the International Sevens, with national sides and invited selected teams; the men's qualifying tournament for the 2015 Pan American Games in Toronto, Canada, with 2 spots available; and the women's qualifying tournament for 2015 Toronto with 2 spots also available. All matches were played at the Aldovisi club's premises.

Results

Men's

See also 
Mar del Plata Sevens
Rugby sevens at the 2015 Pan American Games

References

2015
2015 rugby sevens competitions
Rugby sevens at the 2015 Pan American Games
2015 in Argentine rugby union